Juan Miranda (born 3 June 1968) is a Salvadoran swimmer. He competed in two events at the 1984 Summer Olympics.

References

1968 births
Living people
Salvadoran male swimmers
Olympic swimmers of El Salvador
Swimmers at the 1984 Summer Olympics
Place of birth missing (living people)